The 2008 Central League Climax Series (CLCS) consisted of two consecutive series, Stage 1 being a best-of-three series and Stage 2 being a best-of-six with the top seed being awarded a one-win advantage. The winner of the series advanced to the 2008 Japan Series, where they competed against the 2008 Pacific League Climax Series (PLCS) winner. The top three regular-season finishers played in the two series. The CLCS began on with the first game of Stage 1 on October 18 and ended with the final game of Stage 2 on October 25.

First stage

Summary
The Hanshin Tigers were awarded home-field advantage for the entirety of Stage 1; however, all three games were played in the Orix Buffaloes' Kyocera Osaka Dome, a neutral field, as renovations to Koshien Stadium prevented postseason play.

Game 1

Game 2

Game 3

Second stage

Summary

* The Central League regular season champion is given a one-game advantage in the Second Stage.

Game 1

Game 2

Game 3

Game 4

References

Climax Series
Central League Climax Series